Pattakudi railway station is a railway station in Karaikal district, Puducherry. Its code is PCD. The station consists of 2 platforms. The platform is not well sheltered. It lacks many facilities including water and sanitation.

References

External links

Trichy railway division
Railway stations in Karaikal district